Round square may refer to:

 Round square copula, an example of the dual copula strategy used in philosophy
 Round Square, an international educational organisation

See also
 Rounded square
 Squared circle (disambiguation)